P78 is a regional road (P-Highway) in Kharkiv Oblast, Ukraine. It runs northwest–southeast and connects Kharkiv with Horokhovatka.

In 2019, road rehabilitation works continued on the highway.

See also

 Roads in Ukraine

References

Roads in Kharkiv Oblast